KEB can refer to: 
 Korea Exchange Bank of South Korea, established in 1967 or
 Karl E. Brinkmann GmbH of Germany, established in 1972. 
 Karnataka Electricity Board
 Empress Elisabeth Railway of Austria – German: Kaiserin-Elisabeth-Bahn